Montefusco is a town and comune in the province of Avellino, Campania, Italy. The town is located on the top of a hill overlooking the Sabato river valley.

References

Cities and towns in Campania